Domenico Fisichella (born 15 September 1935) is an Italian academic and politician, who served as culture minister in the Berlusconi I Cabinet from 1994 to 1995.

Career
Fisichella taught political science at Sapienza University of Rome and the Luiss Business School. He wrote for Rome daily Il Tempo.

He was a founding member of the right-wing National Alliance. He was the constitutional advisor of Gianfranco Fini, the leader of the party. He was appointed minister of culture to the first cabinet of Silvio Berlusconi on 10 May 1994. Fisichella replaced Alberto Ronchey in the post. Fisichella's ministerial term ended in December 1994 when the cabinet resigned.

In 1994, Fisichella became a member of the Senate of the Republic and served there until 2008. He became an independent senator when he left the National Alliance in January 1996. He served as the deputy speaker of the Italian senate for ten years. After leaving politics, he continued to work at the University of Florence and Sapienza University of Rome, and as of 2012 he  was also a lecturer at Luiss University of Rome.

Views
Fisichella was the ideologue of the National Alliance and a monarchist.

Controversy
Although Fisichella is a distinguished and leading political scientist in the international academic circles, his appointment as culture minister caused serious concerns in the international press.

Works
Fisichella is the author of several books, including Istituzioni politiche. Struttura e pensiero (1999); Denaro e democrazia. Dall’antica Grecia all’economia globale (2000); Politica e mutamento sociale (2002) and Elezioni e democrazia. Un’analisi comparata (2003).

See also
Fisichella family
Fisichella (surname)

References

External links

20th-century Italian journalists
20th-century Italian politicians
20th-century Italian male writers
1935 births
Culture ministers of Italy
Domenico
Italian columnists
Italian male non-fiction writers
Italian monarchists
Living people
National Alliance (Italy) politicians
Academic staff of the Sapienza University of Rome
Academic staff of the University of Florence